Guéra or Guera  may refer to:
 Guéra Prefecture, a former first-level administrative division of Chad until 1999
 Guéra Region, a first-level administrative division of Chad since 2002
 Guéra Department, a second level administrative division of Guéra Region, Chad
 Kperou Guera, a village in Parakou subdistrict, Borgou Department, Benin
 La Guera, a town in Western Sahara, also known as Lagouira
 R. M. Guéra (born 1959), a Serbian comic book author and illustrator